Sami Khedira (born 4 April 1987) is a German former professional footballer who played as a central midfielder.

He began his career at VfB Stuttgart, winning the Bundesliga in 2007, before moving to Real Madrid in 2010. In his five seasons in Spain, he won seven domestic and international trophies, including the UEFA Champions League in 2014. In 2015, he moved to Italian side Juventus on a free transfer, and won the Serie A title and Coppa Italia in his first three seasons with the club, followed by two more league titles and a Supercoppa Italiana.

A full international for Germany since 2009, Khedira earned 77 caps for the national team. He has taken part at three FIFA World Cups and two UEFA European Championships with Germany, and was part of their squads which reached the semi-finals at the 2010 FIFA World Cup, as well as the 2012 and 2016 UEFA European Football Championships; he also won the 2014 FIFA World Cup.

Club career

VfB Stuttgart
Before joining the youth team of VfB Stuttgart in 1995, he played at TV Oeffingen. In the first months of the 2006–07 season, he was called up into VfB's Bundesliga squad by manager Armin Veh. His debut followed on 1 October 2006 against Hertha BSC, replacing Antônio da Silva at the end of the 2–2 away draw. He scored his first two goals on 29 October in the 3–0 win against Schalke 04 at the Mercedes-Benz-Arena. On 29 January 2007 he signed his first professional contract at VfB, valid until June 2009. In the last game of the season on 19 May, Khedira scored the winner as Die Schwaben came from behind to defeat Energie Cottbus 2–1 and became champions for the first time in 15 years.

On 9 July 2008, he extended his contract until the summer of 2011. In the ensuing season, he scored a career-best 7 league goals in 27 games, including both in a 2–2 draw against Bayern Munich on 13 December.

Real Madrid

On 30 July 2010, Khedira moved to Real Madrid after 98 Bundesliga appearances for an undisclosed fee, signing a contract until 2015. Khedira made his debut on 13 August in a friendly match against Bayern Munich, which Real Madrid won 4–2 on penalties for the Franz-Beckenbauer-Cup. His league debut came sixteen days later, in a 0–0 away draw against Mallorca. He made 40 appearances across his first season in Spain and won his first club honour on 20 April 2011 as his team won the Copa del Rey final against El Clásico rivals FC Barcelona.

He scored his first competitive goal for Real Madrid in the Champions League, on 18 October 2011 against Olympique Lyonnais. He scored his first Copa del Rey goal against Málaga CF in a 3–2 home win when Real Madrid were trailing behind 0–2, and his first league goal against RCD Espanyol in a 5–0 home win.

On 21 April 2012, Khedira scored his second league goal, against Barcelona; the goal was Real Madrid's 108th of the season in the league, breaking the previous La Liga record of 107, also set by them in the 1989–90 season.

On 24 May 2014, Khedira was in the starting 11 against Atletico Madrid in the UEFA Championship League final, in which Real Madrid won 4-1.

Juventus
On 9 June 2015, Italian side Juventus announced that Khedira had signed a four-year deal on a free transfer. The move was completed on 1 July, at the start of the 2015–16 season.

On 1 August, Khedira was stretchered off the pitch after just 25 minutes while playing in a pre-season friendly match against Marseille with a hamstring injury and was ruled out of the Supercoppa Italiana a week later against Lazio. Two days later Juventus confirmed that it was actually a muscle tear in his right thigh, and that he would be sidelined for approximately two months. He was called back to action on 30 September as he started in a Champions League group stage match in a 2–0 win over Sevilla. On 4 October, Khedira made his Serie A debut, starting and scoring the final goal of a 3–1 home win against Bologna in the 63rd minute.

On 20 March 2016, Khedira scored his fourth goal of the league season in a 4–1 win at Torino in the Derby della Mole, but was given a straight red card for dissent later on.

On 20 August 2016, Khedira opened the 2016–17 Serie A season with a goal in a 2–1 home win over Fiorentina. A week later he scored the only goal in a 1–0 away win over Lazio in the league.

On 22 October 2017, Khedira scored his first career hat-trick in a 6–2 away win over Udinese.

On 7 March 2018, Khedira made his 100th appearance for Juventus in a 2–1 win over Tottenham at Wembley Stadium, in the second leg of the round of 16 of the UEFA Champions League, assisting Gonzalo Higuaín's goal.

In September 2018, Khedira signed a new contract with Juventus, which would keep him at the team until 2021. In February 2019 he was ruled out for a month to undergo treatment after it was diagnosed that he suffered from an irregular heartbeat. He returned to action on 6 April, coming as a substitute for his injured compatriot Emre Can in a 2–1 home win over Milan.

Hertha BSC
On 1 February 2021, Khedira returned to the Bundesliga, signing for Hertha BSC. On 5 February 2021, he made his debut in a 0–1 defeat against Bayern Munich. On 19 May 2021, he announced that he would retire at the end of the 2020–21 season.

International career

Youth teams and debut
Khedira has appeared 30 times for several German youth national teams; he captained the under-21 side during the 2009 European Under-21 Championship, which Germany won, defeating England 4–0 in the final. 

Khedira made his debut for the senior national squad on 5 September 2009 in a friendly match against South Africa. He was substituted on in the 73rd minute for Simon Rolfes.

2010 World Cup
Khedira was called up to the German squad for the 2010 World Cup in South Africa by coach Joachim Löw. Filling in for the injured Michael Ballack as a central midfielder, he played in all seven matches, and was only substituted twice, as Germany reached the semi-finals. After appearances in five friendlies prior to the World Cup, he made his first competitive appearance against Australia in Germany's first group game. On 10 July 2010, with his first senior international goal, he scored Germany's 16th and last goal of the tournament, in the third place match against Uruguay; Khedira's match-winning header, which came eight minutes from time, ensured the final 3–2 scoreline, and won the young German team the bronze medal.

Euro 2012
Khedira was in the starting lineup in eight qualification matches for Euro 2012, helping Germany top their qualifying group with a record ten wins out of ten matches. During the final tournament, he featured in every minute of their run to the semi-finals, scoring in the 4–2 quarter-final win over Greece at the PGE Arena Gdańsk, and was selected for the Team of the Tournament.

2014 World Cup

Khedira tore his ACL in his right knee in a friendly match against Italy on 15 November 2013 and it was estimated that he would be ruled out for around six months, which put his participation at the 2014 FIFA World Cup into question. However, he recovered in time to be named in Germany's squad for the tournament, and was selected to start in the team's opening match, a 4–0 win against Portugal. On 8 July, he scored Germany's fifth goal in the 7–1 semi-final defeat of hosts Brazil. He was injured during the pre-match warmup for the Final against Argentina, and was replaced by Christoph Kramer in the team's starting line-up, as Germany eventually won 1–0 after extra time.

Euro 2016
Khedira was named to Joachim Löw's 23-man Germany squad for UEFA Euro 2016. On 2 July, he was forced off after sustaining an injury in the first half of the quarter-finals against Italy, and was ruled out for the remainder of the tournament; Germany won the match 6–5 in the resulting penalty shoot-out, following a 1–1 draw after extra-time. As in the previous edition of the tournament, Germany were once again eliminated in the semi-finals of the competition, following a 2–0 defeat to hosts France on 7 July.

2018 World Cup
On 4 June 2018, Khedira was included in Joachim Löw's final 23-man squad for the 2018 FIFA World Cup. As Germany were eliminated in the group stage, Khedira was deemed as one of the weakest performers in the squad. After the tournament, he was left off the team for the subsequent UEFA Nations League matches.

Style of play
Khedira is considered a dynamic and well-rounded midfielder, with good awareness and "flawless aerial ability", who can cover a lot of ground efficiently, recover the ball and quickly join in the team's attacking plays; he is also capable of being a goal threat with his heading accuracy and powerful mid-range shooting. A physically strong, energetic, and tactically intelligent player, he is also known for his ball-winning abilities, work-rate, and vision, as well as his solid technique and reliable passing, which allow him to play anywhere in midfield; although usually a central midfielder, he has also been deployed as a defensive midfielder, as a box-to-box midfielder, or even in a more offensive role as a mezzala, due to his stamina, movement (both on and off the ball), positional sense, and versatility, which also enable him to create space or contribute to his team's offensive plays with goals, due to his ability to make late runs into the penalty area from behind. Jonathan Wilson, when writing for The Guardian in 2013, described Khedira as a "destroyer with carrying tendencies," namely a holding midfielder who is predominantly tasked with running, winning back possession, and distributing the ball to other players, but who is also "capable of making late runs or carrying the ball at his feet." In spite of his playing ability, however, Khedira is also known to be injury-prone. His playing role and style have been likened to that of compatriot Torsten Frings.

Broadcasting
In May 2021, Khedira was announced as one of several former players who would serve as studio analysts for ESPN's coverage of the rescheduled UEFA Euro 2020.

Personal life
Khedira was born in Stuttgart, Baden-Württemberg. His father is Tunisian and his mother is German. Sami's younger brother Rani plays for Union Berlin and has represented the German U19 team.

Career statistics

Club

International

As of match played 27 June 2018. Scores and results list Germany's goal tally first.

Honours

VfB Stuttgart
Bundesliga: 2006–07

Real Madrid
La Liga: 2011–12
Copa del Rey: 2010–11, 2013–14
Supercopa de España: 2012
UEFA Champions League: 2013–14
UEFA Super Cup: 2014
FIFA Club World Cup: 2014

Juventus
Serie A: 2015–16, 2016–17, 2017–18, 2018–19, 2019–20
Coppa Italia: 2015–16, 2016–17, 2017–18
Supercoppa Italiana: 2018
 UEFA Champions League runner-up: 2016–17

Germany U21
UEFA European Under-21 Championship: 2009

Germany
FIFA World Cup: 2014

Individual
UEFA European Championship Team of the Tournament: 2012

Orders
Order of Merit of Baden-Württemberg: 2016

References

External links

1987 births
Living people
Footballers from Stuttgart
German footballers
Germany youth international footballers
Germany under-21 international footballers
Germany international footballers
Association football midfielders
VfB Stuttgart II players
VfB Stuttgart players
Real Madrid CF players
Juventus F.C. players
Hertha BSC players
Regionalliga players
Bundesliga players
La Liga players
Serie A players
UEFA Champions League winning players
2010 FIFA World Cup players
UEFA Euro 2012 players
2014 FIFA World Cup players
UEFA Euro 2016 players
2018 FIFA World Cup players
FIFA World Cup-winning players
German expatriate footballers
German expatriate sportspeople in Italy
German expatriate sportspeople in Spain
Expatriate footballers in Italy
Expatriate footballers in Spain
Recipients of the Order of Merit of Baden-Württemberg
German people of Tunisian descent
German sportspeople of African descent